Julian Lluka (born 14 February 1991) is an Albanian footballer who most recently played for Shkumbini Peqin as a midfielder.

References

External links

1991 births
Living people
Footballers from Gjirokastër
Albanian footballers
Association football midfielders
Luftëtari Gjirokastër players
FK Dinamo Tirana players
KF Apolonia Fier players
KS Sopoti Librazhd players
KS Shkumbini Peqin players
Kategoria Superiore players
Kategoria e Parë players